Dr. Hugh Gordon Hylvestra Cummins (2 February 1891 – 26 October 1970) was a Barbadian politician. He served as Premier of Barbados from 17 April 1958 to 8 December 1961 and was a member of the Barbados Labour Party (BLP).

In 1919, Dr. Cummins graduated from Queen's Faculty of Medicine where he became medical practitioner and later established a medical practice in the Bridgetown. In 1940, he became one of the first Barbados Labour Party members of Parliament. In 1951 he together with Grantley Herbert Adams, Mencea Cox (Sir Mencea) and Frank Walcott (Rt. Excellent Sir Frank) were appointed members of the Executive Committee of the BLP. He also became a Minister in 1954 when Ministerial Government was introduced. Cummins was the Speaker of the House of Assembly of Barbados from 1956 to 1958.

He became the second Premier of Barbados when Sir Grantley was elected Prime Minister of the West Indies Federation. During his premiership he held the additional portfolio of Minister of Finance. 

His outstanding achievement was the abolition of the Located Labourers Act and he is commemorated by the naming of the ABC Highway and the Gordon Cummins Hospital in St. Thomas, the constituency that he represented.

See also
 Politics of Barbados
 List of Premiers/Prime Ministers of Barbados

References

1891 births
1970 deaths
Finance ministers of Barbados
Prime Ministers of Barbados
Leaders of the Barbados Labour Party
Speakers of the House Assembly of Barbados